Ǩ (K with a caron) is a letter used in the Laz language and in the Skolt Saami language, where it represents  and  respectively. The Unicode codepoints for this letter are U+01E8 ("Ǩ") for the capital letter, and U+01E9 ("ǩ") for the lowercase letter.

References

See also
 Caron

K-caron